James David Greenblatt (born January 2, 1967), best known as James Marshall, is an American actor, known for playing the character James Hurley in the television series Twin Peaks (1990–1991), its 1992 prequel film Twin Peaks: Fire Walk with Me, and its 2017 revival, and for his role as Private Louden Downey in A Few Good Men (1992).

Early life
Marshall was born in Queens, New York. His father, William R. Greenblatt, was a Radio City Music Hall publicist, and his mother, Charlotte Green, danced with The Rockettes as Charlotte Bullard. The family moved from New Jersey to California in the 1980s. Marshall has one sister, Kat Green, a music and film producer.

Career
Marshall's feature debut film was the Charlie Sheen vehicle, Cadence (1990). He played the lead role in Gladiator (1992). Since then, Marshall has appeared in numerous films: Hits! (1994), Vibrations (1996), All She Ever Wanted (1996), Criminal Affairs (1997), Soccer Dog: The Movie (1999), Luck of the Draw (2000), alongside Naomi Watts in Down (2001) and Alien Lockdown (2004). He also provided the voice for Kurt in the video game Unlimited Saga.

Personal life
Marshall is married to actress Renee Griffin, with whom he has a son and a stepson.

In summer 2010, Marshall sued the pharmaceutical company Hoffmann-LaRoche (a unit of Roche Holding AG) for $11 million in damages for injuries which, he claimed, resulted from his taking the drug Accutane. He claimed he had suffered Accutane-related gastrointestinal distress so severe that it necessitated a four-month hospital stay and the surgical removal of his colon.  He asserted that these injuries had derailed his acting career. Stars Martin Sheen (a longtime family friend), Brian Dennehy, Esai Morales and Rob Reiner (Marshall's director on A Few Good Men) were to testify on his behalf. Marshall's case against Hoffmann-LaRoche was ultimately unsuccessful.

His health now substantially improved, Marshall has begun a new career as a musician.

Filmography

Film

Television

References

External links

1967 births
Living people
Male actors from New York City
People from Queens, New York
American male film actors
20th-century American male actors
21st-century American male actors
American male television actors